Wes or WES may refer to:

Organizations
 World Education Services, United States and Canada (founded 1974)
 Wiltshire Emergency Services, South West England (1998–2014)
 Women's Engineering Society, United Kingdom (founded 1919)

People
 Wes (given name), a list of people and fictional characters so named
 Wes Madiko (1964–2021), Cameroonian musician
 William Wesley (born 1964), American basketball executive
 Wesley "Wes" Correa (born 1962), American–Puerto-Rican basketball player

Places
 Wesel (district), Germany (on vehicle registration plates)
 Westmorland, county in England (Chapman code in genealogy)
 WES Commuter Rail, a rail line in Oregon, United States

Science and technology
 Warehouse execution system, in the distribution industry
 Whole exome sequencing, in genomics
 Windows Embedded Standard, an operating system